Boron trioxide or diboron trioxide is the oxide of boron with the formula . It is a colorless transparent solid, almost always glassy (amorphous), which can be crystallized only with great difficulty. It is also called boric oxide or boria.   It has many important industrial applications, chiefly in ceramics as a flux for glazes and enamels and in the production of glasses.

Structure
Boron trioxide has three known forms, one amorphous and two crystalline.

Amorphous form
The amorphous form (g-) is by far the most common. It is thought to be composed of boroxol rings which are six-membered rings composed of alternating 3-coordinate boron and 2-coordinate oxygen.

Because of the difficulty of building disordered models at the correct density with many boroxol rings, this view was initially controversial, but such models have recently been constructed and exhibit properties in excellent agreement with experiment. It is now recognized, from experimental and theoretical studies, that the fraction of boron atoms belonging to boroxol rings in glassy  is somewhere between 0.73 and 0.83, with 0.75 = 3/4 corresponding to a 1:1 ratio between ring and non-ring units. The number of boroxol rings decays in the liquid state with increasing temperature.

Crystalline α form
The crystalline form (α-) is exclusively composed of BO3 triangles. It crystal structure was initially believed to be the enantiomorphic space groups P31(#144) and P32(#145), like γ-glycine; but was later revised to the enantiomorphic space groups P3121(#152) and P3221(#154) in the trigonal crystal system, like α-quartz

Crystallization of α- from the molten state at ambient pressure is strongly kinetically disfavored (compare liquid and crystal densities). It can be obtained with prologed annealing of the amorphous solid ~200°C under at least 10 kbar of pressure.

Crystalline β form
The trigonal network undergoes a coesite-like transformation to monoclinic β- at several gigapascals (9.5 GPa).

Preparation
Boron trioxide is produced by treating borax with sulfuric acid in a fusion furnace. At temperatures above 750°C, the molten boron oxide layer separates out from sodium sulfate. It is then decanted, cooled and obtained in 96–97% purity.

Another method is heating boric acid above ~300°C. Boric acid will initially decompose into steam, (H2O(g)) and metaboric acid (HBO2) at around 170°C, and further heating above 300°C will produce more steam and diboron trioxide. The reactions are:

H3BO3 → HBO2 + H2O

2 HBO2 →  + H2O

Boric acid goes to anhydrous microcrystalline  in a heated fluidized bed.  Carefully controlled heating rate avoids gumming as water evolves.

Boron oxide will also form when diborane (B2H6) reacts with oxygen in the air or trace amounts of moisture:

2B2H6(g) + 3O2(g) → 2(s) + 6H2(g)

B2H6(g) + 3H2O(g) → (s) + 6H2(g)

Reactions
Molten boron oxide attacks silicates. Containers can be passivated internally with a graphitized carbon layer obtained by thermal decomposition of acetylene.

Applications
Major component of borosilicate glass
Fluxing agent for glass and enamels
An additive used in glass fibres (optical fibres)
The inert capping layer in the Liquid Encapsulation Czochralski process for the production of gallium arsenide single crystal
As an acid catalyst in organic synthesis
As a starting material for the production of other boron compounds, such as boron carbide

See also
boron suboxide
boric acid
sassolite
Tris(2,2,2-trifluoroethyl) borate

References

External links
National Pollutant Inventory: Boron and compounds
Australian Government information
US NIH hazard information. See NIH.
Material Safety Data Sheet
CDC - NIOSH Pocket Guide to Chemical Hazards - Boron oxide

Boron compounds
Acidic oxides
Glass compositions
Sesquioxides